CommonLoops (the Common Lisp Object-Oriented Programming System; an acronym reminiscent of the earlier Lisp OO system "Loops" for the Interlisp-D system) is an early programming language which extended Common Lisp to include Object-oriented programming functionality and is a dynamic object system which differs from the OOP facilities found in static languages such as C++ or Java. Like New Flavors, CommonLoops supported multiple inheritance, generic functions and method combination. CommonLoops also supported multi-methods and made use of metaobjects. CommonLoops and New Flavors were the primary ancestors of  CLOS. 
CommonLoops was supported by a portable implementation known as Portable CommonLoops (PCL) which ran on all Common Lisp implementations of the day.

References

Further reading
 The Loops Manual, Daniel G. Bobrow, Mark Stefik. Intelligent Systems Laboratory, Xerox Corporation, 1983

Lisp (programming language)
Common Lisp (programming language) software